Shah Bolaghi (also Romanized as Shāh Bolāghī) is a village in Abarshiveh Rural District, in the Central District of Damavand County, Tehran Province, Iran. At the 2006 census, its population was 9, in 6 families.

References 

Populated places in Damavand County